John Richardson House may refer to:

 John Richardson House (Barnstable, Massachusetts), listed on the NRHP in Massachusetts
 John Richardson Homestead, Dublin, New Hampshire, listed on the NRHP in Cheshire County, New Hampshire
 John Richardson House (Lancaster, New York), property listed on the National Register of Historic Places in Erie County, New York

See also
Richardson House (disambiguation)